The old residence of  is located on the island of Ishigaki, Okinawa Prefecture, Japan. Erected around 1819 by the local governor, it has been designated an Important Cultural Property as representative of the architecture of the Yaeyama Islands. The gardens are a Place of Scenic Beauty.

See also

 Ryūkyū Kingdom
 Japanese architecture
 Japanese gardens

References

Gardens in Okinawa Prefecture
Buildings and structures in Okinawa Prefecture
Places of Scenic Beauty
Important Cultural Properties of Japan